Fung Hak-on (born 12 September 1948 – 2 March 2016) was a Hong Kong actor. He appears in Hong Kong films since the 1960s until mid 2010s.

Career
In 1955, Fung became an actor in Hong Kong films. Fung first appeared in Seven Bodies, Eight Deaths and Nine Human Heads, a 1955 film directed by Fung Fung. Fung often plays the antagonist in films.

Fung was nominated for Best Action Choreography at the 2nd Hong Kong Film Awards in 1983 for his work in Dragon Lord with co-star Jackie Chan and stunt coordinator Corey Yuen Kwai.

He portrayed Master Cheng in Ip Man 2 (2010) in his final years.

His sister, Fung Bo-bo, is also an actress.

Death
He died on 2 March 2016 from cancer.

Selected filmography

 Xin ye guang bei (1962)
 Piu ling goo fung (1962)
 Ying E sha sao (1963)
 Si feng qiu huang (1969)
 Bao biao (1969)
 Vengeance (1970)
 The Heroic Ones (1970) as Warlord Zhu's soldier
 The Chinese Boxer (1970) as Chung-Yi student (uncredited)
 Xiao sha xing (1970)
 King Eagle (1971) as Lo Brothers's thug
 Xin du bi dao (1971)
 The Duel (1971) as Gan's man
 Fei xia shen dao (1971)
 Wu ming ying xiong (1971)
 Duel of Fists (1971)
 The Deadly Duo (1971)
 Lei ru fung(1971) as Guard
 Bi hu (1972)
 Boxer from Shantung (1972) as Tan Si's Coachman / Yang's thug (uncredited)
 E ke (1972)
 Shui hu zhuan (1972)
 Da sha shou (1972)
 The Delightful Forest (1972)
 Fang Shi Yu (1972) as Fang's friend
 Man of Iron (1972) as Yu Chow-Kai's thug
 Ying han (1972)
 Si qi shi (1972) as 'Hello John' waiter
 Ding tian li di (1973)
 Xiao za zhong (1973)
 Fen nu qing nian (1973) as Kung fu student / Boss Lan's Bodyguard
 Pan ni (1973)
 The Awaken Punch (1973) as Tsao Sze-hu
 Jing cha (1973)
 Man zhou ren (1973)
 Mo gui tian shi (1973)
 Xiao lao hu (1973) as Thug
 Huang Fei Hong (1973)
 Yi wang da shu (1973)
 Da dao Wang Wu (1973)
 Da zhang fu yu sao gua fu (1973)
 Zui jia bo sha (1973) as Ou San Yeh
 Hei ren wu (1973)
 Hong Xi Guan Fang Shi Yu Liu A Cai (1974) as Hsiang
 Lang bei wei jian (1974)
 Shao Lin zi di (1974)
 Ah Niu ru cheng ji (1974)
 Wu long jiao yi (1974)
 Peng you (1974)
 The Legend of the 7 Golden Vampires (1974) as Hsi Sung
 Tie han rou qing (1974)
 Shaolin Martial Arts (1974)
 Na Zha (1974)
 Wu da han (1974) as Street ruffian
 Five Shaolin Masters (1974) as Chang Chin-Chiu
 Shatter (1974) as Kung Fu Student (uncredited)
 Guai ren guai shi (1974)
 Da lao qian (1975)
 Hou sheng (1975)
 Hong quan xiao zi (1975) as Lun Ying Tu
 Big Brother Cheng (1975) as Prince Ji's man
 Lang wen (1975)
 The Fantastic Magic Baby (1975) as Erlang Shen
 Shen da (1975) as Liu Deruei's man
 Chu jia ren (1975)
 All Men Are Brothers (1975) as Rebel Officer
 Ba guo lian jun (1976) as Boxer
 Killer Clans (1976) as Roc Soc. member
 Challenge of the Masters (1976) as Yeung Chung
 Qian Long huang qi yu ji (1976)
 Dai Mung Sing (1976)
 The Magic Blade (1976) as Tao's man
 Li Xiao Long zhuan qi (1976) as Challenger to Bruce Lee on 'Enter the Dragon' Set
 Tie quan xiao zi (1977)
 Executioners from Shaolin (1977) as Governor's Henchman (uncredited)
 Qiao tan nu jiao wa (1977) as Thug
 Si da men pai (1977)
 Pai yu lao hu (1977)
 Fa qian han (1977) as Attacker
 Jue sha ling (1977)
 The Iron-Fisted Monk (1977) as Official
 Hot Blood (1977) as Cat Eye
 The Sentimental Swordsman (1977) as White Snake
 The Lonely Killer (1977)
 San shi liu mi xing quan (1977) as Tai Kuang's opponent
 Can ku da ci sha (1978)
 Mang quan guai zhao shen jing dao (1978)
 Da sha xing yu xiao mei tou (1978)
 Chuan ji Fang Shi Yu (1978)
 Nan yang tang ren jie (1978)
 Snake in the Eagle's Shadow (1978) as Master Chao Chi-Chih
 Chu zhong (1978)
 Enter the Fat Dragon (1978) as Gene
 Zhui gan pao tiao peng (1978) as Robber
 Ha luo, ye gui ren (1978)
 Gui ma gong fu (1978)
 Warriors Two (1978) as Mo
 Lao hu tian ji (1978)
 Fo Shan Zan xian sheng (1978) as Hsiao Fei
 Lao shu la gui (1979)
 Last Hurrah for Chivalry (1979) as Pray / Let It Be
 Magnificent Butcher (1979) as Ko Tai-hoi
 Wu zhao sheng you zhao (1979)
 Gui ying shen gong (1979)
 She xing zui bu (1980) as Yueh I
 The Young Master (1980) as Kam's Bodyguard #1
 Po jie da shi (1980) as On Yuen
 Zui she xiao zi (1980)
 Lao shu jie (1981)
 Yong zhe wu ju (1981) as Demon Tailor
 Dragon Lord (1982) as The Killer King
 Legend of a Fighter (1982) as White Man's Lackey
 Shu Shan - Xin Shu shan jian ke (1983) as Evil Disciple
 Huo pin you jian qu (1983)
 Winners and Sinners (1983) as Pat
 Wu ye lan hua (1983)
 Fei xiang guo he (1983)
 Da xiao bu liang (1984)
 Shang Hai zhi yen (1984) as Ma
 The Protector (1985) (uncredited)
 Long de xin (1985) as Restaurant patron
 Police Story (1985) as Danny Chu Ko
 Lucky Stars Go Places (1986) as Xiao Ke
 Shen tan zhu gu li (1986) as Chen Lung
 Magnificent Warriors (1987) as Japanese Agent
 Dragons Forever (1988) as Ship Thug (uncredited)
 A Bloody Fight (1988) as Fung
 Tiger Cage (1988) as Hung's buddy
 Haam ging bin yuen (1988) as Nut-Cracker
 Little Cop (1989) as Yi's henchmen
 Long zhi zheng ba (1989) as Witness
 Miracles (1989) as One of Tiger Lo's men
 Seven Warriors (1989) as Wu Long
 Just Heroes (1989) as Informant
 Chung tin siu ji (1989)
 Meng gui wu ting (1989) as Handsome
 Jui gaai chak paak dong (1990) as Parking Garage Security Chief
 Kei bing (1990)
 Dou shi sha xing (1990) as Nightclub Patron
 Lit foh ching sau (1991)
 Po jian ji xian feng (1991)
 Yan gui kuang qing (1991)
 Seong lung wui (1992)
 Handsome Siblings (1992) as Monk Blackie
 Jueh doi shuen giu (1992) as Monk Blackie
 Du wang zhi zun (1992) as Thug
 Ren sheng de yi shuai jin huan (1993) as Brother Black
 Mo lu kuang hua (1993) as Possessed Man
 Bian cheng lang zi (1993) as Siu Bee-Lei
 Sheng gang da zhui ji (1995)
 Gui ba shi (1995) as Andy
 Baan sau chuk dak hin dui (2002) as Jean Paul
 Black Mask vs. Gambling Mastermind (2002)
 Ze go ah ba zan bau za (2004)
 Kung Fu Hustle (2004) as Harpist Assassin #2
 Cocktail (2006) as Mr. Chan
 2 Become 1 (2006) as Master Ng
 Lethal Angels (2006) as Sgt. Wai
 Yan tsoi gong wu (2007)
 Gong Tau: An Oriental Black Magic (2007) as Master Clear Water
 Triad Wars (2008) as 'Uncle' Li Chun Tong
 Sing kung chok tse 2: Ngor but mai suen, ngor mai chi gung (2008)
 Tau chut (2009)
 Rebellion (2009) as Uncle Man
 14 Blades (2010) as Justice Escort's Counselor
 Ip Man 2 (2010) as Master Cheng
 A Chinese Ghost Story (2011) as Second Village Head
 Da er long (2011)
 Tai Chi 0 (2012) as Lao Zhao
 Ip Man: The Final Fight (2013) as Chess onlooker
 Badges of Fury (2013) as Old fighter at cafe
 Once Upon a Time in Shanghai (2014) as Scruffy Chou (final film role)

References

External links
 

1948 births
2016 deaths
Action choreographers
Male actors from Guangdong
Chinese male film actors
20th-century Hong Kong male actors
21st-century Hong Kong male actors
20th-century Chinese male actors
21st-century Chinese male actors